Abdul Majid al-Qaʿud (1943 – 4 March 2021) was a veteran Libyan politician under Muammar Gaddafi. He served as Mayor of Tripoli from 1971 to 1972, Minister of Agriculture from 1972 to 1976, Minister of Energy from 1978 to 1982, and General Secretary of the People's Committee (Prime Minister) from 29 January 1994 to 1 March 1997.

In May 2018, al-Qa'ud was among the high-profile Gaddafi loyalists who declared their support for Khalifa Haftar at a forum in Benghazi.

Al-Qaʿud died in Istanbul, Turkey on 4 March 2021, at the age of 78.

References

1943 births
2021 deaths
Justice ministers of Libya
Libyan people of Arab descent
Prime Ministers of Libya